"Kiss It Better" is a single from Deborah Harry's third solo album, Def, Dumb & Blonde in 1989. The single peaked at number 12 on the US Modern Rock chart, riding the wave of success built by Harry's previous single, "I Want That Man". Though never released commercially, a promo found its way to many college radio stations, hence the song charting so much lower than the previous one. The single was also not released in the UK.

"Sweet and Low"/"Kiss It Better" was released as a double A-side single in Australia in 1990.

Charts

References

Songs about kissing
Debbie Harry songs
1989 singles
Songs written by Debbie Harry
Songs written by Alannah Currie
Songs written by Tom Bailey (musician)
1989 songs
Sire Records singles